Glosson may refer to:

Buster Glosson (born 1942), deputy chief of staff, U.S. Air Force, Washington D.C.
Clyde Glosson (born 1947), former American football wide receiver
Lonnie Glosson (1908–2001), American country musician, songwriter, and radio personality
William Glosson (1937–1996), American gridiron football player

See also
Glisson
Glossen